Tuula Katriina Puputti (born 5 November 1977) is a Finnish retired ice hockey goaltender and current general manager of the Finnish women's national ice hockey team and women's national under-18 ice hockey team, and Developer of Girls' Hockey for the Finnish Ice Hockey Association.

As a member of the Finnish national team, Puputti won a bronze medal in the women’s ice hockey tournament at the 1998 Winter Olympics, and three IIHF World Women's Championship bronze medals, in 1997, 1999, and 2000. She also competed at the 2002 Winter Olympics and 2001 IIHF Women's World Championship.

References

External links
 
 

1977 births
Living people
Finnish women's ice hockey goaltenders
Olympic ice hockey players of Finland
Ice hockey players at the 1998 Winter Olympics
Medalists at the 1998 Winter Olympics
Olympic bronze medalists for Finland
Olympic medalists in ice hockey
Ice hockey players at the 2002 Winter Olympics
Minnesota Duluth Bulldogs women's ice hockey players
People from Kuopio
Sportspeople from North Savo